Evangelical Christian School, also known as ECS, is a private, non-denominational, evangelical Christian school in Memphis and Germantown, Tennessee. It was founded in 1965 and joined Association of Christian Schools International in 1984. It hosts grades Pre-K to 12, with grades Pre-K through 5th grade at the Lower School campus in Germantown and grades 6-12 at the Macon campus in Memphis' Cordova section.

History
ECS was established in 1965 as part of a wave of private schools formed by white parents in response to desegregation of the public schools. The school began with only primary grades and added one grade each year with the first high school class graduating in 1975.

Notable alumni
Brad Cottam, professional football player, Kansas City Chiefs
Morgan Cox, professional football player, Tennessee Titans
Drew Holcomb, musician
Barrett Jones, professional football player
Spencer Pulley, professional football player, Los Angeles Chargers
Brent Rooker, professional baseball player, Minnesota Twins
George Sherrill, pitcher, Atlanta Braves, Los Angeles Dodgers
Skal Labissière, professional basketball player, Portland Trail Blazers
Christopher Daniel Duntsch, AKA "Dr. Death", former neurosurgeon, serving life sentence for gross malpractice resulting in the death and maiming of multiple patients.
Jimmy Sexton, sports agent
Garrison Starr, professional musician

References

External links
 Evangelical Christian School

Christian schools in Tennessee
Nondenominational Christian schools in the United States
Private K-12 schools in Tennessee
Preparatory schools in Tennessee
Schools in Memphis, Tennessee
Segregation academies in Tennessee